Zhu Dawei (朱大渭; born 1931 in Sichuan, Xizhong) is a Chinese historian. He is author of The Social History of the Six Dynasties and many other books on the Six Dynasties era. In 1991, he was awarded special expert status by the State Council of the People's Republic of China and, in 2006, elected emeritus academician of the Chinese Academy of Social Sciences.

References

1931 births
People's Republic of China historians
Living people
Historians from Sichuan
20th-century Chinese historians
21st-century Chinese historians
20th-century Chinese male writers
21st-century male writers